Miss Moonlight can refer to:
Maxine Mesinger, a gossip columnist
Miss Moonlight (video game), a Dreamcast video game